The Federation Professional League (FPL) was a South African football (soccer) league founded in 1969. It was established to allow coloureds and Indian South Africans to participate in a competitive league.

It was established in the wake of the SASL's disbandment in 1967 and was considered a rival to the National Football League which was only available to white South Africans.

Previous winners

When the league folded in December 1990, six teams continued for the next season, at the highest level of South African football, known as NSL Castle League. Those six highest ranked teams were: Real Taj, Tongaat Crusaders United, Bosmont Chelsea, Santos, Manning Rangers, Dangerous Darkies.

Player awards

Player of the year

Top Goalscorers

References

 
Defunct soccer leagues in South Africa
Soccer and apartheid